The betel, Piper betle, is a species of flowering plant in the pepper family Piperaceae, native to Southeast Asia. It is an evergreen, dioecious vine, with glossy heart-shaped leaves and white catkins. Betel plants are cultivated for their leaves which are most commonly used as flavoring in chewing areca nut (betel nut chewing).

Etymology
The term betel was derived from the Malayalam word vettila via Portuguese.

Distribution
Piper betle is originally native to Southeast Asia, from the Philippines, Timor-Leste and the Lesser Sunda Islands and Peninsular Malaysia to Indochina (Vietnam, Cambodia, Laos, Thailand, and Myanmar). Its cultivation has spread along with the Austronesian migrations and trade to other parts of Island Southeast Asia, Papua New Guinea and Melanesia, Micronesia, South Asia, the Maldives, Mauritius, Réunion Island, and Madagascar. It has also been introduced during the Colonial Era to the Caribbean.

Cultivation

The betel leaf is cultivated mostly in South and Southeast Asia, from Pakistan to Papua New Guinea. It needs a compatible tree or a long pole for support. Betel requires well-drained fertile soil. Waterlogged, saline and alkali soils are unsuitable for its cultivation.

In Bangladesh, farmers called barui prepare a garden called a barouj in which to grow betel. The barouj is fenced with bamboo sticks and coconut leaves. The soil is plowed into furrows of 10 to 15 m length, 75 cm in width and 75 cm depth. Oil cakes, manure, and leaves are thoroughly incorporated with the topsoil of the furrows and wood ash. The cuttings are planted at the beginning of the monsoon season.

Proper shade and irrigation are essential for the successful cultivation of this crop. Betel needs constantly moist soil, but there should not be excessive moisture. Irrigation is frequent and light, and standing water should not remain for more than half an hour.

Dried leaves and wood ash are applied to the furrows at fortnightly intervals and cow dung slurry is sprinkled. Application of different kinds of leaves at monthly intervals is believed advantageous for the growth of the betel. In three to six months, the vines reach 150 to 180 cm in height, and they will branch. Harvest begins with the farmer plucking the leaf and its petiole with his right thumb. The harvest lasts 15 days to one month. The betel plant has made its way to research labs of many Bangladesh chemical and food nutrition companies.

The harvested leaves are consumed locally and exported to other parts of Asia, the Middle East, Europe, and the Americas. Betel is grown and cultivated as an important crop in rural Bangladesh.

Cultural significance

The primary use of betel leaf is as a wrapper for the chewing of areca nut (or in modern times, tobacco), where it is mainly used to add flavour. The practice originated in the Philippines around 5000 years ago (where the oldest remains of areca nuts and lime from crushed sea shells have been found in the Duyong Cave archaeological site). It was spread along with the Austronesian migrations to the rest of Southeast Asia, Taiwan, South China, and South Asia. However, it is unknown when betel leaves were first combined with areca nuts, since areca nuts can be chewed alone.

While the practice of chewing Betel leaf existed even before the common era, with attested references from at least the 3rd century CE, the ingredient mix (paan/ betel quid) it was chewed with changed over time. Areca nut, mineral slaked lime and catechu were the historic ingredients, as referenced in texts from 9th century CE, and tobacco started to feature in the 20th century.  The practice of chewing betel leaf is on the decline, and now the quid consisting of tobacco, areca nut, and slaked lime (gutka) is more popular.

In India and Sri Lanka, a sheaf of betel leaves is traditionally offered as a mark of respect and auspicious beginnings. Occasions include greeting elders at wedding ceremonies, celebrating the New Year, and offering payment to physicians and astrologers (to whom money and/or areca nut, placed on top of the sheaf of leaves, are offered in thanks for blessings).

In Papua New Guinea and the Solomon Islands, the inflorescence stalk of the betel tree, known as daka or "mustard stick", is consumed together with the leaves.

It may also be used in cooking, usually raw, for its peppery taste. Use of binglang, or betel, has over a 300-year history in areas of China, where it was once promoted for medicinal use.

Health effects
Epidemiological studies demonstrate a close association between the incidence of cancer in India and the chewing of betel quid containing tobacco, areca nut, lime and betel leaf. Chewing paan (betel quid) is strongly associated with a higher risk of developing head and neck cancer, as well as oropharyngeal squamous cell carcinoma (OPSCC), a form of cancer that affects the mouth, tonsils, and throat. Attempts have been made to confirm the carcinogenic/ mutagenic of betel quid or its ingredients. Betel leaf extract alone has not been shown to cause adverse effects. Smokeless tobacco products have been shown to exhibit mutagenic and carcinogenic behavior. A scientific study from Japan found that lab rats that ate a mixture of betel leaf and areca nuts had severe thickening of the upper digestive tract, whereas after a diet of betel leaves alone, only one laboratory rat developed a forestomach papilloma. Multiple studies demonstrate that betel quid without added tobacco also causes esophageal cancer, and in some instances, liver cancer. In a cancer diagnosis patterns study with patients that chewed betel quid with different ingredient combinations, the risk was found to be the highest for those using any form of tobacco.  International Agency for Research on Cancer (IARC) and the World Health Organization (WHO) accept the scientific evidence that chewing tobacco and areca nut is carcinogenic to humans. As with chewing tobacco, chewing betel quid with tobacco and areca nut is discouraged by preventive healthcare efforts.

Reports suggest that betel leaf by itself has beneficial effects, in part because of its anti-mutagenic effects against mutagens (tobacco and areca nut) in betel quid. While earlier studies hypothesized a potential mutagenic role for betel leaf in causing oral cancers, subsequent studies invalidated it by isolating compounds (eugenol and hydroxychavicol) in betel leaf that have anti-mutagenic roles.  These compounds were also found to reduce the carcinogenic burden imposed by tobacco and areca nut. Hydroxychavicol is found to demonstrate anti-prostate cancer efficacy in an in vitro (human prostate cancer cells) and in vivo ( BALB/c nude mice) study.

Chemical composition
Chemistry of betel leaf varies geographically and is mostly chavibetol dominant. Safrole is a major component of Sri Lankan piper betle. Eugenol, Isoeugenol, and Germacene D are other dominant compounds in other chemotypes.

Leaves also contain eugenol, chavicol, hydroxychavicol and caryophyllene

Stems contain phytosterols (beta-sitosterol, beta-daucosterol, stigmasterol etc.), alkaloids (piperine, pellitorine, piperdardine, guineensine etc.), lignan (pinoresinol) and other bioactive components. Some of them are oleanolic acid, dehydropipernonaline, piperolein-B, Bornyl cis-4-Hydroxycinnamate and Bornyl p-Coumarate.

Roots contain aristololactam A-II, a new phenylpropene, 4-allyl resorcinol and a diketosteroid stigmast-4-en-3,6-dione.

Essential oil consisted of 50 different compounds, of which major components are eugenol, caryophyllene, terpinolene, terpinene, cadinene and 3-carene.

Economics

Betel vines are cultivated throughout southeast Asia in plots whose area is typically 20 to 2000 square metres (0.005 to 0.5 acre).

Malaysian farmers cultivate four types of betel plants: sirih India, sirih Melayu, sirih Cina and sirih Udang. The harvest is then sold in bundles of leaves, each bundle costing in 2011 between MYR 0.30 to 0.50 ($0.07 to $0.12).

In Sri Lanka, betel is grown all over the country, but the commercial production of betel, with bigger leaves with dark green colour combined with thickness, known as “kalu bulath”, is confined to a few districts, such as Kurunagala, Gampaha, Kegalle, Kalutara and Colombo. These are sold at a wholesaler in lots of 1000 leaves. According to a report published by the United Nations Food and Agriculture Organization (FAO), a successful betel farm in Sri Lanka can provide a supplemental income to a farmer by providing six days of work every six months and net income when the leaf prices are attractive. The FAO study found the successful farm's yield to be 18,000 leaves per . The additional salary and income to the Sri Lankan betel grower, assuming he or she provides all needed labor and keeps all net profit, is SL Rs. 1635 per  of betel farm every 6 months ($90 per "decimal" per year, or $9000 per acre per year). If the farmer hires outside labor to tend the betel vines and harvest the crop, the FAO found the net income to the betel farm owner to be SL Rs. 735 per  of betel farm every six months ($40 per decimal per year, or $4000 per acre per year). According to FAO, the market prices for betel leaves vary with wet and dry season in Sri Lanka, and in 2010 averaged SL Rs. 200–400 per 1000 leaves ($1.82 to $3.64 per 1000 leaves). The FAO study assumes no losses from erratic weather and no losses during storage and transportation of perishable betel leaves. These losses are usually between 35% to 70%.

In Bangladesh, betel leaf farming yields vary by region and vine variety. In one region where betel leaf cultivation is the main source of income for farmers, a total of 2,825 hectares of land is dedicated to betel vine farming. The average production costs for these betel farms in Bangladesh are about Tk 300,000 per hectare ($4000 per hectare, $16 per decimal), and the farm owners can earn a profit of over Tk 100,000 per hectare ($1334 per hectare, $5.34 per decimal).

In India, a 2006 research reported betel vines being cultivated on about 55000 hectares of farmland, with an annual production worth of about IN Rs. 9000 million ($200 million total, averaging $1455 per acre). The betel farming industry, the report claims, supports about 400,000 – 500,000 agricultural families.

A March 2011 report claims that betel farming is on a decline in India. While in ideal conditions some farms may gross annual incomes after expenses of over IN Rs. 26,000 per 10 decimal farm ($5,780 per acre), a betel farm's income is highly erratic from year to year, due to varying rainfall patterns, temperature, and spoilage rates of 35% to 70% during transport over poor infrastructure. Simultaneously, the demand for betel leaves has been dropping in India due to acceptance of gutkha (chewing tobacco) by consumers over betel leaf-based ‘‘paan’’ preparation; the report cites betel leaf trading has dropped by 65% from 2000 to 2010 and created an oversupply. As a result, the report claims Indian farmers do not find betel farming lucrative anymore.

See also
Kava
Domesticated plants and animals of Austronesia

References

Further reading
 
 'The Art of Chewing Betel', in: Forbes, Andrew, and Henley, David, Ancient Chiang Mai Volume 3. Chiang Mai, Cognoscenti Books, 2012. ASIN: B006IN1RNW

The Merck Manual. Tumours of The head and neck. Introduction to Inner Ear Disorders - Ear, Nose, and Throat Disorders
Betel-quid and Areca-nut Chewing and Some Areca-nut-derived Nitrosamines, from IARC Monographs on the Evaluation of Carcinogenic Risks to Humans, Volume 85 (2004)
California adds Betel and Areca nut to the list of substances known to cause cancer under TOXIC ENFORCEMENT ACT OF 1986

External links 

 

Piper (plant)
Flora of the Indian subcontinent
Herbal and fungal stimulants
Medicinal plants of Asia
Taxa named by Carl Linnaeus
Dioecious plants